The 1968–69 Divizia A was the fifty-first season of Divizia A, the top-level football league of Romania.

Teams

League table

Results

Top goalscorers

Champion squad

See also 
 1968–69 Divizia B
 1968–69 Divizia C
 1968–69 County Championship

References

Liga I seasons
Romania
1968–69 in Romanian football